William  Issacher Garfield Kingdon (25 June 1907 – 18 March 1977) was an English footballer who played, as a wing-half, over 240 games for Aston Villa. Towards the end of his career, he joined Southampton, before becoming a manager in lower-league football.

Playing career

Aston Villa
Kingdon was born in Worcester and after playing for Kidderminster Harriers, joined Aston Villa  in 1925. In his time at Villa Park, Villa were moderately successful, reaching the Football League runners-up position twice, in 1930–31 and 1932–33, and the FA Cup semi-final in 1933–34. After this there came a period of decline, culminating in relegation in 1935–36, thereby becoming the last of the founder members of the football league to lose top flight status for the first time. Kingdon left Villa 1936 to join Southampton

Southampton
At Southampton he displayed "a nice line in distribution and looked to be an asset". In 1936–37 he formed a useful partnership with fellow half-backs Bill Kennedy and Cyril King and only missed one game, although Southampton struggled near the bottom of the Second Division. He briefly became team captain until, in September 1937, new manager Tom Parker acquired the services of Scottish international Frank Hill, who had won the Football League title three times with Arsenal (in 1932–33, 1933–34 and 1934–35). Hill immediately took over both the captaincy and Bill's No. 6 shirt, and after Hill's arrival, Kingdon only made one further appearance, and in January 1938 joined Yeovil & Petters United as player-manager.

Yeovil Town
He remained with Yeovil for the duration of World War II, but in 1946 he returned to his trade as a carpenter. In 1947 he accepted the position as manager at Weymouth, combining this with running the Fountain Hotel in Weymouth.

He died in Weymouth in March 1977, aged 69.

References

External links
Aston Villa career details

1907 births
Sportspeople from Worcester, England
1977 deaths
English footballers
Aston Villa F.C. players
Southampton F.C. players
Yeovil Town F.C. players
English football managers
Yeovil Town F.C. managers
Weymouth F.C. managers
Kidderminster Harriers F.C. players
Association football midfielders